Boat Rocker Media is a Canadian entertainment company based in Toronto, Ontario. The company owns Boat Rocker Studios, which incorporates Temple Street Productions. Its majority shareholder is Fairfax Financial. Boat Rocker is led by co-executive chairs David Fortier and Ivan Schneeberg and CEO John Young.

Boat Rocker produces and distributes a wide range of scripted and unscripted television shows, animation and family content, such as Invasion, American Rust, Billie Eilish: The World's a Little Blurry, Orphan Black, and Dino Ranch.

Boat Rocker owns other entertainment properties, including Jam Filled Entertainment, Insight Productions, Matador Content, and Platform One Media, and does talent management and venture investing.

History 
Boat Rocker Media was established in 2003 by Ivan Schneeberg and David Fortier. Its largest division, Boat Rocker Studios, encompasses Temple Street Productions, which was acquired by Schneeberg and Fortier in 2006.  The company's other divisions were Boat Rocker Animation, Boat Rocker Ventures, and Boat Rocker Rights.

Boat Rocker Rights' first outside distribution deal was with the pick-up of international rights to Steve Rotfeld Productions' Xploration Station block's programs in late February 2016. Then in June 2016, the unit acquired Mountain Road Productions library distribution rights plus a first look deal with the company.

In 2016, Boat Rocker purchased Radical Sheep Productions, which continued operating as Boat Rocker's family and children's media unit. In early August 2016, Boat Rocker purchased Jam Filled Entertainment, which was to continuing operating with current management and name. Boat Rocker through Jam Filled purchased Arc Productions' main assets on August 22, 2016, and reopened Arc's Toronto office.

In January 2018, Boat Rocker acquired FremantleMedia's Kids & Family Entertainment division, which includes the children's programming library of Thames Television.

In November 2018, Boat Rocker acquired Matador Content, producers of the Paramount Network series Lip Sync Battle and its spinoff Lip Sync Battle Shorties on sister network Nickelodeon.

In March 2019, Boat Rocker invested in Untitled Entertainment, a talent management and production company. It has also made investments in Realm Media, the Toronto Arrows, CAA Creative Labs, and MarcoPolo Learning.

In September 2019, Boat Rocker acquired Platform One Media, a Los Angeles-based television production and sales company operated by television producer Katie O’Connell Marsh, whose credits include Hannibal and Narcos. Marsh stayed on after the acquisition.

In December 2020, Temple Street was incorporated into Boat Rocker Studios, Scripted.

Boat Rocker signed first-look deals with Lena Headey’s Peephole Productions and Dakota Johnson's TeaTime Pictures. In March 2021, it partnered with television executive Jessica Sebastian-Dayeh to create Maven, which focuses on female-led stories.

Most recently, on December 20, 2021, Boat Rocker had bought out a minority stake in the TeaTime Pictures production company.

Units
Boat Rocker Brands
Boat Rocker Rights
Boat Rocker Ventures
Boat Rocker Studios, Scripted
Boat Rocker Studios, Unscripted
 Matador Content
 Maven
 Insight Productions
 Proper Television
Boat Rocker Studios, Kids and Family
 Industrial Brothers (minority stake)
 Jam Filled Entertainment

Filmography

Animation

Live-action

Upcoming

References

External links
 Official website

Canadian companies established in 2003
Holding companies established in 2003
Companies based in Toronto
Companies listed on the Toronto Stock Exchange
Mass media companies established in 2003
Holding companies of Canada
Television production companies of Canada
2003 establishments in Ontario